The Karaga are a geographical subgroup of the Koryaks in Russia.  They live on the Kamchatka Peninsula primarily in the Koryak Autonomous Oblast.

Sources
Wixman, Ronald.  The Peoples of the USSR: An Ethnographic Handbook (Armonk: M. E. Sharpe, 1984) p. 93

Ethnic groups in Russia